The Spain Rally Superchampionship (from spanish: Super Campeonato de Espana de Rally) is a rallying series run over the course of a year. The 2022 season is the 4th season of the series and is composed of 10 rounds in total. The season began on March 4 with Rally Tierras Altas de Lorca and is set to finish on December 16 with the non-point scoring round, Rallyshow Madrid.

2022 calendar
For season 2022, there will be 10 events - 3 on gravel and 7 on tarmac.

Note: Rally Isla de Los Volcanes was set to take part on April 29–30. However, the rally was cancelled on April 28, despite the crews already being on the island.

Entrants

Class 1

Results and standings

Season summary

Point scoring system

Points are awarded to the top 20 crews each rally.

Each round has a special stage called TC+ (can be selected by the rally organizers, otherwise it's the last stage).

Results

Pepe Lopez is the current championship leader.

References

Rally competitions in Spain
Spain Rally Superchampionship